Wychall Reservoir, is a canal compensation reservoir in the Kings Norton district of Birmingham, England.

It was built in the early 19th century by the Worcester Canal Company, after mill owners claimed that water was being taken from the River Rea to fill the canal, thereby reducing the working effectiveness of their mills.

Now defunct as a reservoir it has been adopted by Birmingham City Council, along with the nearby Merecroft Pool,  as a Local Nature Reserve. A low level of water is maintained with the drained area a combination of meadow, woodland and reedbed.

See also

Edgbaston Reservoir
Lifford Reservoir

References

River Rea Heritage Trail
 
Friends of Kings Norton Nature Reserve

Canal reservoirs in England
Nature reserves in Birmingham, West Midlands
Reservoirs in the West Midlands (county)